The kaige revision, or simply kaige, is the group of revisions to the Septuagint made in order to more closely align its translation with the proto-Masoretic Hebrew. The importance of this revision lies in its status as a precursor to later revisions by 'the Three' (i.e., Aquila, Symmachus and Theodotion) as well as the light it sheds on the origins of the Septuagint. 

The individual revisions characteristic of kaige were first observed by Dominique Barthélemy in the Greek Minor Prophets Scroll from Nahal Hever. According to Arie Van Der Kooij "his thesis about the K[aige] T[ranslation] has been widely accepted, but his dating of Theodotion before Aquila has not."

Tetragrammaton 
Ellis R. Brotzman (retired professor of Old Testament at Tyndale Theological Seminary) and Eric J. Tully (assistant professor of Old Testament and Semitic languages at Trinity Evangelical Divinity School) claim that a characteristic of the kaige translation is that it wrote YHWH in paleo-Hebrew script instead of translating it into Greek. When referring to kaige recension in 8HevXII gr, Kristin De Troyer makes the following affirmation: "The problem with a recension is that one does not know what is the original form and what the recension. Hence, is the paleo-Hebrew Tetragrammaton secondary – a part of the recension – or proof of the Old Greek text? This debate has not yet been solved."

Influence on the New Testament 

Emanuel Tov wrote that "in some book of the New Testament and in early Christian literature, Hebraizing revisions of the OG often were quoted rather than the OG version itself, reflecting the beginning of the decline of the LXX (the OG) in Judaism". According to Tuukka Kauhanen, the authors of the New Testament could too know a kaige type Septuagint text. Some scholars have exposed different views to explain why in citation of Zechariah 12:10 in John 19:37 "with known forms of the text reveals that it demonstrates many similarities with the Hebrew Masoretic text", which includes Martin Hengel who "speak of possibly identifying John's citation with... 8HevXII gr. Tov also wrote that D. A, Koch has shown that in his letters, Paul sometimes "refers to recensions of the Old Greek towards a proto-Masoretic text."

See also 
 Bible translations into Greek
 Hexapla

References

Further reading 
 Timothy Michael Law, When God Spoke Greek, Oxford University Press, 2013.
 Natalio Fernandez Marcos "The B-text of Judges: Kaige Revision and Beyond", in After Qumran. Old and Modern Editions of the Biblical Text – The Historical Books, Edited by H. Ausloos, B. Lemmelijn, J. Trebolle Barrera. BETL 246. Lovaina-Paris-Walpole MA, Peeters 2012, 161–170.

Bible versions and translations
Septuagint
Biblical studies